The 2015–16 National League 2 North is the seventh season (29th overall) of the fourth tier of the English domestic rugby union competitions since the professionalised format of the second division was introduced. There was talk of this being the last season in this format due to RFU changes to tier four which were supposed to result in a restructuring of the league from two regional divisions (north and south) to three (north, south-east and south-west) for the 2016–17 season but this seems to have been put on hold due to protests from the northern clubs who stood to lose revenue from a smaller fixture list.

Teams joining the division include Macclesfield and Tynedale (both relegated from National League 1), Sale and Sandal (both promoted from National League 3 North) and South Leicester (promoted from National League 3 Midlands).  A further change this season saw Harrogate play their first game at their new ground at Rudding Lane – a move from their previous ground of Claro Road where they had been stationed for the past 119 years – beating local rivals Otley in front of a club record crowd of 1,050.

At the end of the season, Macclesfield made an instant return to National League 1 after their relegation the previous season by winning the championship with three games to go, defeating Chester 40-12 to take the title at Priory Park – the club's third National League 2 North title and a record so far in the division.  The two bottom clubs at the end of the season were Huddersfield, who went down in Round 27, and Broadstreet, who followed one week later.  While both teams were fairly competitive (gaining 7 and 8 wins apiece)  the third relegation spot was much more keenly fought with five teams facing the drop up on the last round of the season.  In the end it was Sandal who went down after one season spent in National League 2 North, losing their final game against Luctonians, while their relegation rivals all won.  It was a particularly interesting contest between Sandal and fellow promoted club, Sale, who were actually in the final relegation spot on the last day (although they did have a rescheduled game still to play) but the Heywood Road side won against high flying Caldy to stay in the division.  Another interesting feature of the season was Caldy's Nick Royle whose 25 tries saw him finish not only as the top try scorer in the league but also as the record all-time try scorer in the division with 161 tries overall.

As league runners up to Macclesfield by some distance, Sedgley Park had to travel down to Hertfordshire to face the 2015–16 National League 2 South runners up, Old Albanian, who hosted the game due to a superior league record.  In the end Old Albanian were too good for Sedgley Park, winning 24 – 0 to claim the final promotion place to the 2016–17 National League 1.

Structure
The league consists of sixteen teams with all the teams playing each other on a home and away basis to make a total of thirty matches each. There is one automatic promotion place, one play-off place and three relegation places. The champions are promoted to the 2016–17 National League 1 and the runners-up play the second-placed team in the 2015–16 National League 2 South with the winner being promoted. The last three teams are relegated to either National League 3 Midlands or National League 3 North depending on the geographical location of the team.

Participating teams and locations
Eleven of the teams listed below participated in the 2014–15 National League 2 North season; Macclesfield and Tynedale were relegated from the 2014–15 National League 1, Sale (champions) and Sandal (play-offs) were promoted from National League 3 North while South Leicester (champions) were promoted from National League 3 Midlands.

League table

Fixtures

Round 1

Round 2

Round 3

Round 4

Round 5

Round 6

Round 7

Round 8

Round 9

Round 10

Round 11

Round 12

Round 13

Postponed due to severe weather and flooding.  Game rescheduled to 27 February 2016. 

Postponed due to severe weather causing flooding.  Game rescheduled to 27 February 2016.

Round 14

Postponed due to waterlogged pitch.  Game rescheduled to 27 February 2016.

Postponed due to waterlogged pitch.  Game rescheduled to 27 February 2016.

Round 15

Round 16

Postponed due to pitch being deemed unsuitable to play due to heavy rain.  Game rescheduled to 12 March 2016.

Round 17

Postponed due to waterlogged pitch caused by heavy rain.  Game to be rescheduled for 12 March 2016.

Round 18

Postponed due to waterlogged pitch.  Game to be rescheduled for 12 March 2016.

Postponed due to frozen pitch.  Game to be rescheduled for 12 March 2016.

Postponed due to bad weather.  Game to be rescheduled for 12 March 2016.

Postponed due to frozen pitch.  Game to be rescheduled for 26 March 2016.

Postponed due to bad weather.  Game to be rescheduled for 27 February 2016.

Round 19

Round 20

Postponed due to Sandal being unwilling to play what they considered to be an unsafe pitch caused by recent rain.  Game to be rescheduled for 26 March 2016.

Round 21

Postponed due to bad weather conditions.  Game to be rescheduled for 7 May 2016.

Postponed due to waterlogged pitch caused by heavy rain.  Game to be rescheduled for 7 May 2016.

Postponed due to waterlogged pitch caused by heavy rain.  Game to be rescheduled for 26 March 2016.

Postponed due to waterlogged pitch caused by heavy rain.  Game to be rescheduled for 26 March 2016.

Round 22

Round 23

Rounds 13, 14 & 18 (rescheduled games)

Game rescheduled from 12 December 2015.

Game rescheduled from 5 December 2015.

Game rescheduled from 12 December 2015.

Game rescheduled from 5 December 2015.

Game rescheduled from 16 January 2016.

Round 24

Postponed due to bad weather conditions.  Game to be rescheduled for 14 May 2016.

Rounds 16, 17 & 18 (rescheduled games)

Game rescheduled from 2 January 2016.

Game rescheduled from 9 January 2016.

Game rescheduled from 16 January 2016.

Game rescheduled from 16 January 2016.

Game rescheduled from 16 January 2016.

Round 25

Rounds 18, 20 & 21 (rescheduled games)

Game rescheduled from 30 January 2016.

Game rescheduled from 16 January 2016.

Game rescheduled from 6 February 2016.

Game rescheduled from 6 February 2016.

Round 26

Round 27

Huddersfield are relegated.

Round 28

Broadstreet are relegated.

Round 29

Round 30

Sandal are relegated.

Round 21 (rescheduled games)

Game rescheduled from 6 February 2016.

Game rescheduled from 6 February 2016.

Round 24 (rescheduled game)

Game originally rescheduled from 5 March 2016 but would ultimately be cancelled at Harrogate's request as the game would not affect the final league table standings.

Promotion play-off
Each season, the runners-up in the National League 2 North and National League 2 South and  participate in a play-off for promotion to National Division 1. Old Albanian were runners-up in the 2015–16 National League 2 South and because they had a better record than the 2015–16 National League 2 North runners-up, Sedgley Park, they hosted the play-off match.

Season attendances

Individual statistics
 Note that points scorers includes tries as well as conversions, penalties and drop goals. Appearance figures also include coming on as substitutes (unused substitutes not included).  Does not include promotion playoff.

Top points scorers

Top try scorers

Season records

Team
Largest home win – 66 pts
83 – 17 Sedgley Park at home to Sandal on 26 March 2016
Largest away win – 47 pts
53 – 6 Sedgley Park away to Harrogate on 7 May 2016
Most points scored – 83
83 – 17 Sedgley Park at home to Sandal on 26 March 2016 
Most tries in a match – 13
Sedgley Park at home to Sandal on 26 March 2016
Most conversions in a match – 9
Sedgley Park at home to Sandal on 26 March 2016
Most penalties in a match – 6 (x3)
Stourbridge at home to Caldy on 19 September 2015
Preston Grasshoppers away to Stourbridge on 3 October 2015
Caldy away to South Leicester on 10 October 2015
Most drop goals in a match – 1
N/A – multiple teams

Player
Most points in a match – 28 (x2)
 Lewis Barker for Macclesfield away to Huddersfield on 28 November 2015
 Matt Riley for Sedgley Park at home to Sandal on 26 March 2016
Most tries in a match – 3 
N/A – multiple players
Most conversions in a match – 9
 Matt Riley for Sedgley Park at home to Sandal on 26 March 2016
Most penalties in a match – 6 (x2)
 Christopher Scott for Stourbridge at home to Caldy on 19 September 2015
 Sean Taylor for Preston Grasshoppers away to Stourbridge on 3 October 2015
Most drop goals in a match – 1
N/A – multiple players

Attendances
Highest – 1,050 
Harrogate at home to Otley on 5 September 2015
Lowest – 50 (x2) 
South Leicester at home to Sedgley Park on 12 September 2015 
South Leicester at home to Caldy on 10 October 2015 
Highest Average Attendance – 403
Stourbridge
Lowest Average Attendance – 110
South Leicester

See also
 English rugby union system
 Rugby union in England

References

External links
 NCA Rugby

2015–16
2015–16 in English rugby union leagues